Ivan Olshanski (Olshansky) (or , , died in or after 1402) was a member of the Lithuanian princely Alšėniškiai (Holshansky) family. Historians only know his father's name, Algimantas. Ivan was a faithful companion of Vytautas the Great, Grand Duke of Lithuania. They both were married to daughters of Sudimantas of Eišiškės. Ivan's daughter Juliana became the third wife of Vytautas in 1418. His granddaughter Sophia became the fourth wife of King Władysław Jagiełło in 1424.

His patrimony consisted of Halshany, Iwye, Hlusk, Porechye and others.

Biography 
Ivan first appears as one of Jogaila's boyars during the truce between Lithuanian princes and the Prussian branch of the Teutonic Order in 1379. Then he was present during the signing of a treaty of Dovydiškės in 1380. When Vytautas escaped to the Teutonic Knights in 1382, Ivan followed him and Jogaila took away the Principality of Alšėnai. However, as Vytautas and Jogaila reconciled few years later, Ivan gifted Jogaila with a golden belt and received his principality back. Ivan followed Vytautas when he escaped to the knights once again in 1390 during the Lithuanian Civil War. In late 1390, Ivan escorted Sophia, the only child of Vytautas, to Moscow via Marienburg, Danzig and Pskov, where she married Vasily I of Moscow. After Vytautas gained a powerful ally in the east, Jogaila agreed to make peace and Treaty of Astravas was signed in 1392. Ivan became the right hand of Vytautas, and after Skirgaila death, he ruled Kyiv as governor.

Knowing the influence Ivan had in the Grand Duchy of Lithuania, the Teutonic Order demanded that Ivan Holshansky ratify treaties, for example, the Treaty of Salynas of 1398. He and his sons signed the Pact of Vilnius and Radom in 1401. On 12 February 1401 in Merkinė he swore allegiance to King Władysław and the Polish Crown in the event of the death of Grand Duke Vytautas. On each of these occasions he appears without the title of the ruler of Kyiv, so it is possible that his reign there was short and ended already before 1398. Allegiance to king Władysław was the last documented mention of him, and it is believed he died in that year or shortly after.

Religion 
He was a Ruthenianized Orthodox Christian. His father Algimantas was baptised in the Orthodox faith under the name of Michael, during his rite of tonsure he received the name of Euthymius.

Family 
Ivan's wife was Agrypina, daughter of Prince of Smolensk Sviatoslav Ivanovich, possible sister of Anna, wife of Grand Duke Vytautas. They had four sons: Andrew, Semen, Aleksander and Michael, and daughter Uliana, married first to Prince of Karachev later to Grand Duke Vytautas.

Mentions in document 
 1379: Iwan Augemunten son
 1390: herczog Iwan von Galschan Ongemundes son
 1398: Iwanen Awmunten son
 1398: dux Ywan de Gloschaw<ref>Codex dimplomaticus Lithuaniae, p. 256.</ref>
 1401: dux Yvanus Olgimuntis cum filiis suis videlicet Andrea et Semeone et ceteris 1401: knjazь Iwan Olkimontowicz'' (latinisation of the original ruthenian text)

References

Sources 
 
 
 
 
 
 
 
 

1400s deaths
Ivan
Year of birth unknown